RMS Samaria was a transatlantic ocean liner built for Cunard Line. She was completed in 1922 and served until 1955. In the Second World War she was a troopship in the Royal Navy. Samaria was scrapped in 1956.

Building
Cammell Laird & Company in Birkenhead built Samaria for Cunard Line, launching her on 27 November 1920. Fitting out for service took somewhat longer than usual due to post war demands on industry but in due course Samaria entered service in April 1922.

Service
Intended to augment Cunard's transatlantic service Samaria ran on the Liverpool to Boston and New York City route with periodic stops in Cobh, and appealed to those first and second class passengers looking for comfort at reasonable rates and who were not in a hurry. Originally the ship was intended to make a profit in the immigrant trade with third class passengers. However the end of unrestricted immigration to the United States in the mid 1920s necessitated the first of several reconfiguration of passenger accommodations as third class became "tourist."

Throughout the 1920s and 1930s Samaria was frequently employed as a cruise ship. In September 1940 she took part in the evacuation of children from the UK to the US under the scheme set up by the Children's Overseas Reception Board (CORB). In 1941 the ship was taken over by the Royal Navy and served as a troopship until 1948 when she was returned to Cunard and refitted for passenger service. Between 1948 and 1955 Samaria was assigned almost exclusively to the Canadian route with service to Montreal, Quebec, and Halifax along with her sister-ship . In November 1955 she completed her last transatlantic crossing and was subsequently sold for scrapping, which was completed in 1956 at Inverkeithing, Scotland.

References

1920 ships
Ships built on the River Mersey
Ships of the Cunard Line
Passenger ships of the United Kingdom
Troop ships of the Royal Navy
World War II auxiliary ships of the United Kingdom